Stella is an American television series that originally ran from June 28 to August 30, 2005 on Comedy Central. It was created by and starring Michael Ian Black, Michael Showalter, and David Wain, former cast members of MTV's The State (1993). As a comedy troupe, Stella started in 1997 and played to sold out shows across the United States with a cult following. In September, after 10 episodes, Stellas timeslot was succeeded by Mind of Mencia. The DVD was released on September 12, 2006.

Characters

Main

The "Guys"
 Michael Ian Black as Michael Ian Black
 Michael Showalter as Michael Showalter
 David Wain as David Wain

The Girls Downstairs
 Andrea Rosen as Jennifer. In real life, Rosen is Showalter's former roommate.
 Samantha Buck as Amy
  Heidi Neurauter  as Stacy
In the pilot only, the third roommate was played by Rashida Jones.

Recurring
  Justin Lord as Co-Op Board President, Company CEO, Don Robinson, and Justin Lord

Format
Stella is an adaptation of the Stella comedy troupe's stage show and short films. The series follows Michael, Michael, and David, three infantile men who always dress in suits, live together in a New York apartment, and apparently have no jobs. The show is a mix of sketch comedy and a sitcom; there is a central plot for each episode and recurring characters, but the show ignores continuity and is often surreal.

The trio had made 28 short films between 1998 and 2002, which were shown as part of the live show. The shorts cover various topics such as searching for Santa, mustache growing, pizza eating, and other absurd situations. The group cleaned up much of its material for the show, much of which had been often derived from taboo or adult topics like necrophilia and dildos.

The show employs absurdist humor. Notable guest stars include Paul Rudd, Rashida Jones, Sam Rockwell, Topher Grace, Tim Blake Nelson, Alan Ruck, Janeane Garofalo, Elizabeth Banks, and Edward Norton.

Episodes

References

External links
"Stella: The New Marx Brothers" --Rolling Stone interview
 "A Streetcar Named Hilarious" --The Phat Phree interview
 "Stella" --The Onion interview
 "Stella"—Brian M. Palmer interview
 "Gag Order" --Slate.com article
 

2000s American sitcoms
2005 American television series debuts
2005 American television series endings
Comedy Central original programming